Deborah Cameron (born 10 November 1958) is a feminist linguist who currently holds the Rupert Murdoch Professorship in Language and Communication at Worcester College, Oxford University.

Cameron is mainly interested in sociolinguistics and linguistic anthropology. A large part of her academic research is focused on the relationship of language to gender and sexuality. She wrote the book The Myth of Mars And Venus: Do Men and Women Really Speak Different Languages?, which was published in 2007.

Career 
Before her post at Oxford University, Cameron taught at the Roehampton Institute of Higher Education, The College of William & Mary in Virginia, Strathclyde University in Glasgow and the Institute of Education in London.

Selected bibliography

Books

Chapters in books

Journal articles 
 
See also:  and Compulsory Heterosexuality and Lesbian Existence

Further reading

References

External links 
Deborah Cameron, Faculty of Linguistics, Philology and Phonetics at Oxford
Deborah Cameron's academia.edu page--contains links to a number of her writings
Language: A Feminist Guide, her blog
Extracts from her book "The Myth of Mars and Venus" (review):
What language barrier?
Speak up, I can't hear you.

1958 births
Academics of the UCL Institute of Education
Academics of the University of Roehampton
Academics of the University of Strathclyde
Linguists from the United Kingdom
Women linguists
College of William & Mary faculty
Fellows of Worcester College, Oxford
Linguists from England
Living people
Statutory Professors of the University of Oxford
British feminists
20th-century linguists
21st-century linguists